The 2019 UC Davis football team represented the University of California, Davis as a member of the Big Sky Conference during the 2019 NCAA Division I FCS football season. Led by third-year head coach Dan Hawkins, UC Davis compiled an overall record of 5–6 with a mark of 3–5 in conference play, placing in a three-way tie for sixth in the Big Sky. The Aggies played home games at UC Davis Health Stadium in Davis, California.

Previous season
The Aggies finished the 2018 season 10–3, 7–1 in Big Sky play to finish in a three-way tie for the Big Sky championship with Eastern Washington and Weber State. They received an at-large bid to the FCS Playoffs where, after a first round bye, they defeated Northern Iowa in the second round before losing in the quarterfinals to Eastern Washington.

Preseason

Big Sky preseason poll
The Big Sky released their preseason media and coaches' polls on July 15, 2019. The Aggies were picked to finish in second place in both polls.

Preseason All–Big Sky team
The Aggies had two players selected to the preseason all-Big Sky team.

Offense

Jake Maier – QB

Jared Harrell – WR

Schedule

Game summaries

at California

at San Diego

Lehigh

at North Dakota State

Montana

at North Dakota

Cal Poly

at Southern Utah

Weber State

at Portland State

Montana State

at Sacramento State

Ranking movements

References

UC Davis
UC Davis Aggies football seasons
UC Davis Aggies football